Voetbal Vereniging Katwijk is a Dutch football team founded in 1939, based in Katwijk, currently competing in the Dutch Tweede Divisie.

History
Katwijk have become Dutch amateur champions, by winning the overall Topklasse title in 2012–13. As such, they were invited to play in the Dutch Eerste Divisie but, after some consideration, the club opted to stay in the Topklasse, claiming the organisation was not yet ready to compete in the Eerste Divisie. Topklasse runners-up Achilles '29 were ultimately admitted in their place instead.

In the following season, Katwijk failed to repeat its success, and ended the season with being relegated to the Hoofdklasse.

Arch rival is Quick Boys, from the same town.

Head coach 
 Dick Schreuder (2014–2018)
 Jack van den Berg (2018)
 Jan Zoutman (2018–2020)
 Anthony Correia (since 2020)

Honours
Tweede Divisie: 2
 2017–18, 2021–22
Topklasse: 1
 2012–13
Hoofdklasse title: 5
 1992-93, 1993-94, 1994-95, 1999-00, 2014-2015
National Saturday Amateur title: 4
 1992-93, 1993-94, 1999-00, 2012-13
National amateur football title: 4
 1992-93, 1993-94 1999-00, 2012-2013

Current squad

References

External links
 Official website

 
Football clubs in the Netherlands
Football clubs in Katwijk
Association football clubs established in 1939
1939 establishments in the Netherlands